Sean Sullivan (born 16 September 1971) is a former professional footballer and current goalkeeper coach for Maltese Premier League side Valletta, he played as a goalkeeper during his career.

External links
 Sean Sullivan at MaltaFootball.com

References

1971 births
Living people
Maltese footballers
Malta international footballers
Ħamrun Spartans F.C. players
Valletta F.C. players
Floriana F.C. players
Birkirkara F.C. players
People from Valletta
Maltese people of Irish descent
Association football goalkeepers